Palmophyllum crassum is a species of alga. It has a cosmopolitan distribution in deep seawater habitats.

Palmophyllum crassum grows in the form of thalli attached to substrates such as rocks and algae. The thalli are formed from spherical green cells in a gelatinous matrix.

References

External links
 AlgaeBase

Plants described in 1828
Palmophyllophyceae